Kacper Ziemiński (born 4 November 1990 in Więcbork) is a Polish sailor. He competed at the 2012 Summer Olympics in the men's Laser class.

References

External links
sports-reference.com

Polish male sailors (sport)
1990 births
Living people
Olympic sailors of Poland
Sailors at the 2008 Summer Olympics – 470
Sailors at the 2012 Summer Olympics – Laser
People from Więcbork
Sportspeople from Kuyavian-Pomeranian Voivodeship
Sailors at the 2016 Summer Olympics – Laser